Clarence Harmon, Jr. (born November 30, 1955) is a former American football running back in the National Football League (NFL) for the Washington Redskins. He played college football at Mississippi State University.

Harmon graduated from Kosciusko High School in 1973. Following his graduation, Harmon played football for Holmes Community College and Mississippi State University before being drafted by the NFL to play for Washington Redskins. After participation in Super Bowl XVII, he became a science teacher at Jim Hill High School, before settling in Tupelo, Mississippi. He went on to Coach Football at North Pontotoc High School, Bruce High School (2003 and 2004 MHSAA Region 2-2A Champions), and Clarksdale High School.

References

External links

1955 births
Living people
People from Kosciusko, Mississippi
American football running backs
Holmes Bulldogs football players
Mississippi State Bulldogs football players
Washington Redskins players
New Jersey Generals players
Players of American football from Mississippi